Pierre Meuldermans (2 July 1914 – 1 December 1979) was a Belgian footballer. He played in two matches for the Belgium national football team from 1936 to 1938.

References

External links
 

1914 births
1979 deaths
Belgian footballers
Belgium international footballers
Place of birth missing
Association football midfielders